Mitchell Ogren Anderson (born August 21, 1961) is an American character actor and chef.

Anderson was born in Jamestown, New York, to a retail store owner mother and a businessman father. He attended Jamestown High School and Williams College before going on to attend Juilliard School. In 1985, he appeared on the Bert Convy-hosted Super Password, where he won $400.  Anderson is openly gay and came out during the 1996 GLAAD Media Awards, after which point he became active with gay causes and the Human Rights Campaign. Anderson lives in Atlanta, Georgia, with his partner of many years Richie Arpino, and owns a restaurant called MetroFresh.

Filmography

Film

Television

References

External links

MetroFresh

1961 births
Male actors from New York (state)
American male film actors
American male soap opera actors
American male stage actors
American gay actors
LGBT people from Georgia (U.S. state)
LGBT people from New York (state)
Living people
Male actors from Atlanta
People from Jamestown, New York